North End is the northernmost part of the village of Burgh by Sands in the City of Carlisle district of Cumbria, England.

References

Villages in Cumbria
Burgh by Sands